Paul Chollet (10 April 1928 – 13 December 2022) was a French paediatrician and politician of the Union for French Democracy. He served as Mayor of Agen from 1989 to 2001 and was a deputy of the National Assembly from 1986 to 1997.

Biography
Chollet graduated from the Faculty of Medicine at the University of Toulouse and worked as a pediatrician between Bordeaux and Toulouse in the 1960s. He also founded the local branch of UNICEF.

Chollet began his political career as a municipal councillor in Agen in 1977. He was elected mayor of Agen in 1989 and resigned as General Councilor due to the law prohibiting certain dual mandates. He was president of the Amicale des maires de Lot-et-Garonne from 1989 to 2001.

In 1986, Chollet was elected to the National Assembly, representing Lot-et-Garonne through proportional representation. He was re-elected in 1988 in Lot-et-Garonne's 1st constituency, and re-elected again in 1993. He remained in office until 21 April 1997.

Paul Chollet died in Agen on 13 December 2022, at the age of 94.

References

1928 births
2022 deaths
French pediatricians
French politicians
Deputies of the 8th National Assembly of the French Fifth Republic
Deputies of the 9th National Assembly of the French Fifth Republic
Deputies of the 10th National Assembly of the French Fifth Republic
Regional councillors of France
Mayors of places in Nouvelle-Aquitaine
Union for French Democracy politicians
University of Toulouse alumni
People from Lot-et-Garonne